Johann Anderson may refer to:
  (1674–1743), German naturalist
 Johann Anderson (politician) (1905–?), Estonian politician

See also
 Johan Anderson